Al-Aqidah Al-Waasitiyyah is a book of Islamic creed written by Ibn Taymiyyah. It is considered relatively easy to understand compared to Ibn Taymiyyah's other works on creed. Ibn Taymiyyah explained his purpose for writing it as follows:

هَذِهِ كَانَ سَبَبُ كِتَابَتِهَا أَنَّهُ قَدِمَ عَلَيَّ مِنْ أَرْضِ وَاسِطٍ بَعْضُ قُضَاةِ نَوَاحِيهَا شَيْخٌ يُقَالُ لَهُ رَضِيُّ الدِّينِ الواسطي مِنْ أَصْحَابِ الشَّافِعِيِّ قَدِمَ عَلَيْنَا حَاجًّا وَكَانَ مِنْ أَهْلِ الْخَيْرِ وَالدِّينِ وَشَكَا مَا النَّاسُ فِيهِ بِتِلْكَ الْبِلَادِ وَفِي دَوْلَةِ التتر مِنْ غَلَبَةِ الْجَهْلِ وَالظُّلْمِ وَدُرُوسِ الدِّينِ وَالْعِلْمِ وَسَأَلَنِي أَنْ أَكْتُبَ لَهُ عَقِيدَةً تَكُونُ عُمْدَةً لَهُ وَلِأَهْلِ بَيْتِهِ فَاسْتَعْفَيْت مِنْ ذَلِكَ وَقُلْت قَدْ كَتَبَ النَّاسُ عَقَائِدَ مُتَعَدِّدَةً فَخُذْ بَعْضَ عَقَائِدِ أَئِمَّةِ السُّنَّةِ فَأَلَحَّ فِي السُّؤَالِ وَقَالَ مَا أُحِبُّ إلَّا عَقِيدَةً تَكْتُبُهَا أَنْتَ فَكَتَبْت لَهُ هَذِهِ الْعَقِيدَةَ وَأَنَا قَاعِدٌ بَعْدَ الْعَصْرِ وَقَدْ انْتَشَرَتْ بِهَا نُسَخٌ كَثِيرَةٌ؛ فِي مِصْرَ وَالْعِرَاقِ وَغَيْرِهِمَا

This is the reason I wrote it: a man approached me from the land of Wāsiṭ, one of the judges of its regions, a Sheikh named Raḍī al-Dīn al-Wāsiṭī, who was a scholar of Shāfi’ī school. He approached us during the Hajj pilgrimage and he was among the people of virtue and religion. He complained of the people among him in that land under the Tartar government, of the prevalence of ignorance and oppression, the loss of religion and knowledge. He asked me to write a creed for him that he and his household could rely upon. I abstained from that and I said, ‘People have written a number of credal texts, so take one of the creeds written by the Imams of the Sunnah.’ He persisted in asking and he said, ‘I would like no one but you to write it.’ So I wrote this creed for him while I was sitting after midday, and many copies of it have been distributed in Egypt, Iraq, and elsewhere.

Source: 4

See also

 List of Sunni books
 Wasat (Islamic term)

References

Sunni literature
Salafi literature
Athari literature
Books by Ibn Taymiyyah